2017 Apatin Open is a darts tournament, which will take place in Apatin, Serbia in 2017.

References

2017 in darts
2017 in Serbian sport
Darts in Serbia